Omalur Junction railway station is a railway junction in the Salem railway division of the Southern Railway zone serving Omalur and its surrounding areas in Salem, Tamil Nadu. This railway junction also serves as a satellite station for Salem Junction. All the trains halting/passing via Salem Junction from Bengaluru and Mettur stop at Omalur Junction. This station lies on the junction of lines to Bengaluru via Dharmapuri and Hosur and Mettur.

The station has six tracks and two platforms that are mainly for the trains that are waiting to enter Salem Junction. Omalur junction is one of the nearest railway stations to Salem Airport.

Now the station has been extending with 15 crores of large station building and 3rd platform with island platform.

Location and layout
The station has two platforms. The third platform with a subway is under construction it will be finished within two months. 

The station is at the junction of two lines:
 Salem–Bengaluru section
 Salem–Mettur Dam spur line via Omalur it is electrified and doubling track between Omalur to Mettur.

Services
Following is the list of trains that halt at the train station.
Express Services

Passenger Services

References

Salem railway division
Railway stations in Salem district
Railway junction stations in Tamil Nadu